was a town located in Ogachi District, Akita Prefecture, Japan.

In 2003, the town had an estimated population of 9,041 and a density of 29.54 persons per km². The total area was 306.02 km².

On March 22, 2005, Ogachi, along with the town of Inakawa, and the village of Minase (all from Ogachi District), merged into the expanded city of Yuzawa.

Noted people from Ogachi
 Kiyokuni Katsuo, sumo wrestler
 Terukuni Manzō, sumo wrestler
 Yoshihide Suga, former Prime Minister (2020-2021)

External links
 Yuzawa official website 

Dissolved municipalities of Akita Prefecture
Yuzawa, Akita